Cinetodus is a genus of sea catfishes (order Siluriformes) of the family Ariidae.  These species originate from brackish and fresh waters of Irian Jaya, southern New Guinea and northern Australia.

Species
This genus currently contains three described species:
 Cinetodus carinatus (M. C. W. Weber, 1913) – comb-spined catfish
 Cinetodus conorhynchus (M. C. W. Weber, 1913) – Lorentz catfish
 Cinetodus crassilabris (E. P. Ramsay & J. D. Ogilby, 1886) – thick-lipped catfish
 Cinetodus froggatti (E. P. Ramsay & J. D. Ogilby, 1886) – Froggatt's catfish, smallmouthed salmon catfish

References

 
Fish of New Guinea
Fish of Australia
Catfish genera
Taxa named by James Douglas Ogilby
Taxonomy articles created by Polbot